The American Crossword Puzzle Tournament is a crossword-solving tournament held annually in February, March, or April. Due to the COVID-19 pandemic, the 2020 tournament was canceled. In April 2021, the 43rd tournament was held virtually. Founded in 1978 by Will Shortz, who still directs the tournament, it is the oldest and largest crossword tournament held in the United States; the 2019 event set an attendance record with 741 competitors, including over 200 rookies.

For its first 30 years the contest was held at the Marriott in Stamford, Connecticut, but owing to increasing popularity, in 2008 it moved to the larger Marriott Brooklyn Bridge in Brooklyn, New York. In 2015, the tournament returned to Stamford.

The tournament traditionally begins Friday evening with social games and a wine-and-cheese reception. More games are played on Saturday evening, many of them adaptations of television game shows.

Participants and divisions
Anyone can participate, although registration is limited. Participants compete as members of at least two divisions, with prizes awarded based on division. All participants are members of Division A and a regional division; those 25 years old or younger, or at least 50, are also members of an age division. Membership in Divisions B–E and the Rookie Division is based on the participant's past or present tournament status. For the purposes of prizes contestants compete simultaneously in all divisions for which they are eligible, with no more than one cash prize per contestant.

The 11 regional divisions include ten U.S. divisions and a "Foreign" division for the rest of the world. Geographically, three of the 10 U.S. divisions – West, Midwest, and South – span most of the country.  The remaining seven divisions are in the northeastern United States, with three of the seven located in the state of New York.

Format
The main part of the tournament consists of seven rounds, each featuring a puzzle that all competitors solve. There are three rounds in the late morning and three in the early afternoon on Saturday, and the seventh round is on Sunday. Puzzles vary in size and difficulty from round to round. The puzzles are commissioned by Shortz from the top constructors in crosswords, with the fifth puzzle the hardest of the first six. The two three-round sessions consist of puzzles with 15, 17 and 19 squares in each row and column respectively. The Sunday puzzle is appropriately 21 x 21 squares, the size of regulation Sunday puzzles in newspapers. Tournament judges score the solved puzzles on accuracy and speed, and the puzzles are scanned and ranked. Judges typically include many of the nation's most prolific and/or well known crossword constructors and editors.

After these seven rounds, the top three solvers in the top three divisions progress to the final round, which consists of solving a very difficult crossword of 15 × 15 size on an oversize grid on a stage at the front of the tournament room. The competitors in this round wear noise-blocking headphones so that a team of commentators can remark upon the action for the spectators. The solvers hold a sheet of clues and write their answers on the grid with a dry-erase marker for all to see. Accuracy and speed are important as the competitors are ranked by fewest mistakes, then time. The winner of this round is declared the U.S. crossword tournament champion. The top three competitors in the B and C divisions also compete on the same puzzle, though with different sets of clues, for their division titles.

Tournament history
As of 2022, there are six multiple winners: Dan Feyer (8 tournaments),  Tyler Hinman (7), Jon Delfin (7),  Douglas Hoylman (6), David Rosen (4), and Trip Payne (3). Three women have won the tournament: Nancy Schuster in 1978, Miriam Raphael in 1979, and Ellen Ripstein in 2001. 22 of the 76 (29%) second- and third-place finishers have been female.

2006 documentary
The 2006 documentary Wordplay, directed by Patrick Creadon, focuses on Will Shortz and the 2005 American Crossword Puzzle Tournament. It includes interviews with many of the top competitors and climaxes with the final round of the 2005 tournament. The DVD release includes video from the final round of the 2006 tournament. Shortz credits the film as the main reason for the dramatically increased attendance (an increase of 200 contestants) at the 2007 event, which necessitated the subsequent move to Brooklyn.

Dr. Fill
Dr. Fill, a computer program, has been an unofficial competitor in every contest since 2012. In 2021, Dr. Fill inscored all human competitors for the first time.

References

External links
 

Crossword competitions
Competitions in New York City
Recurring events established in 1978
February events
March events
Culture of Stamford, Connecticut
Brooklyn
1978 establishments in Connecticut